Khin Moht Moht Aye (also spelt Khin Moh Moh Aye) is a Burmese actress. She won her first Best Supporting Actress Award in 2008 with A-Myer Nae Ma Thet Hsaing Thaw Thu (The Man who foreign to Public). Throughout her career, she has acted in over 500 films.

She starred in numerous films and TV series.
In many films and TV series, her villainous performances have garnered increased attention and popularity.

Filmography

Film (Cinema)
A-Myer Nae Ma Thet Hsaing Thaw Thu (The Man who foreign to Public) (2008)
Asoe Maya Anetta (အစိုးမရ-အနတ္တ)
Chitchin Alinkar (ချစ်ခြင်းအလင်္ကာ)

Television series
Pan Nu Thway Season 1 (2013)
The Sign of Love: Book 2 (2014)Pan Nu Thway Season 2 (2015)A Yake (2018)Kyamar Noon (2018)Rose (2019)Say Ta Lone Maung Phone (2021)Mahuyar Pearl'' (2023)

Awards and nominations

References

Living people
21st-century Burmese actresses
Year of birth missing (living people)
Burmese film actresses